Rodolfo Pérez Acosta (July 29, 1920 – November 7, 1974) was a Mexican-American character actor who became known for his roles as Mexican outlaws or American Indians in Hollywood western films. He was sometimes credited as Rudolfo Acosta.

Early life and education
Acosta was born to Jose Acosta and Alexandrina Perez de Acosta on July 29, 1920 in the disputed American territory of Chamizal outside of El Paso, Texas. His father, a carpenter, moved the family to Los Angeles, where Acosta was raised and graduated from Lincoln High School. Acosta studied drama at Los Angeles City College and UCLA and he appeared at the Pasadena Playhouse. At the age of 19, he received a scholarship to the Palacio de Bellas Artes in Mexico City where he studied for three years. In 1943, during World War II, Acosta enlisted in the United States Navy where he worked in Naval Intelligence.

Career
After the war, Acosta worked on stage and in films which eventually led to a bit part in John Ford's 1947 film The Fugitive, directed by Emilio Fernández. Fernandez wrote the role of the pimp Paco for Acosta in the 1949 film Salón México, for which Acosta earned a nomination as Best Supporting Actor at the 1950 Ariel Awards. He then was placed on contract by Universal Studios, beginning with a small role in One Way Street (1950). Although Acosta was considered a romantic screen idol in Mexico and South America, his burly body and strong features led to a long succession of roles as bandits, Native American warriors and outlaws in American films. In The Tijuana Story (1957), he had a sympathetic leading role, but in general he spent his career as a familiar western antagonist.

Acosta was also a regular as Vaquero on NBC's The High Chaparral from 1967–1969. His other television appearances included Cheyenne, Maverick, Zorro, Rawhide as Ossolo, an Indian Medicine Man in "The Incident at Superstition Prairie" in 1960, Bonanza, and Daniel Boone.

In 1959, Acosta played the Kiowa Chief Satanta in the third episode entitled "Yellow Hair" of the ABC western series The Rebel, starring Nick Adams as a former Confederate soldier who wanders through the American West. 

Acosta was cast on Death Valley Days as Valdez, the traveling companion of Stephen F. Austin (David McLean), in the 1964 episode "A Book of Spanish Grammar", of the syndicated anthology series. In the story line, Austin travels to Mexico City to purchase land in colonial Texas to sell to future settlers. Valdez  wonders why Austin risks so much to help strangers.

Personal life
Acosta married Jeanine Cohen in 1945 in Casablanca while he was in the military. In 1956, Cohen accused Acosta of adultery for sharing an apartment in Mexico City since 1953 with actress Ann Sheridan. Acosta subsequently filed for divorce in 1957. He later married Vera Martinez in Las Vegas, Nevada on September 18, 1971 and they divorced in October 1974.

Acosta was the father of five children.

On November 7, 1974, Acosta died of liver cancer at the Motion Picture and Television Country House and Hospital in Woodland Hills, California, and was buried in Hollywood Hills at Forest Lawn Cemetery.

Filmography

Film

Television

References

Further reading
  Analysis of Acosta's performances in Víctimas del Pecado and Salon Mexico.

External links

 
 

1920 births
1974 deaths
20th-century American male actors
20th-century Mexican male actors
American male film actors
Burials at Forest Lawn Memorial Park (Hollywood Hills)
Deaths from cancer in California
Deaths from liver cancer
Male Western (genre) film actors
Mexican male film actors
Mexican male television actors
United States Navy personnel of World War II
Male actors from Texas